Atomic beam is special case of particle beam; it is the collimated flux (beam) of neutral atoms.
The imaging systems using the slow atomic beams can use the Fresnel zone plate (Fresnel diffraction lens) of a Fresnel diffraction mirror as focusing element. The imaging system with atomic beam could provide the sub-micrometre resolution. 

Particle accelerators